Holmes Chapel Comprehensive School is a co-educational secondary school and sixth form centre located in Holmes Chapel, Cheshire, England. It was founded in 1978 as a purpose-built 11–18 comprehensive and sixth form. It was opened in September 1978.

The school is a designated academy and Training School which has also been accredited with both Sportsmark and Artsmark awards.

House system 
Pupils are sorted into four houses: Arley, Capesthorne, Moreton and Tatton. Each year, the houses compete for the house cup – which is awarded at the end of each school term.
All siblings (brothers and sisters) are housed together. Each house is led by a member of staff, a Head of House, who manages and cares for the students in their house. The current Heads of Houses are:

Arley — Ms E Bagshaw
Tatton — Mrs C Morgan & Mrs L Chaloner-Mattin
Moreton — Ms J Moyes
Capesthorne — Mrs Annie Bentley

OFSTED 
The most recent Office for Standards in Education, Children's Services and Skills (OFSTED) report concluded as follows:

"This very effective school provides excellent value for money. Its success is based on exceptionally strong leadership, much very good teaching and the very good attitudes of the overwhelming majority of the pupils. The achievement of all groups of pupils is very good. Pupils make very good progress in most subjects and overall results in National Curriculum tests and GCSE and A-level examinations are well above average."

Expansion and development
Since it first opened over 40 years ago, HCCS's pupil population has grown enormously, leading to considerable expansion of the school buildings. In the last five years, a new Arts building was opened, as was an extension to the science department, and a complete refurbishment of all the science rooms was completed during the summer of 2007. Partially funded by donations and sponsorship from parents and local businesses, the Arts building is home to the art and music faculties, along with a number of rooms dedicated to Sixth Form use on the first floor including a common room, and other 'A level only' courses such as sociology and photography. They are looking into another extension which is intended to boost the number of intakes.

In September 2006 a new dining hall facility was completed. This building helped to resolve the problem of over-crowding at lunchtime, allowing lunch to be served in two sittings, rather than four. It also houses a dedicated 'bistro' for the use of Sixth Form pupils, which currently provides food in the mornings, which ends after lunch. A cashless system for dining came into action on 29 January 2007 using cards, and that has since been updated for some years to bio-metric thumbprints, to help solve the problem of lost cards.

Finally, from the start of the school year in September 2012, the school will no longer have independent heads of year who follow their year group through the school, instead adopting a house system of four houses led by a head of house. The four houses are; Capesthorn, Arley, Moreton and Tatton.

In 2013, the sixth form/arts block was redeveloped, also expanding the sixth form building. Temporary buildings were installed on the site for use as teaching facilities for the 6th form during the building period due to the structural defects discovered in the original facility.

In 2016, the Arts building was demolished and has been replaced with a building which boasts its own theatre. The sixth form also resides in this building, with a large amount of teaching rooms, a large common room and a quiet study area. It also has its own cafe which is only for students in year 12 and 13, as well as teachers.

Notable alumni 
Harry Styles – Singer, songwriter  (born 1994)
Dean Ashton – Crewe Alexandra, West Ham United and England footballer (born 1983)
Seth Johnson –  Ex Crewe Alexandra, Derby County, Leeds United and England footballer (born 1979)
Andy Porter – Ex Port Vale player and assistant coach, and York City assistant coach (born 1968)

References
Notes

External links
 
 Most recent OFSTED Report
 League Tables from the BBC

Educational institutions established in 1978
Academies in the Borough of Cheshire East
1978 establishments in England
Secondary schools in the Borough of Cheshire East
Training schools in England